Mtsapere is a French village in the commune of Mamoudzou on Mayotte.

Populated places in Mayotte
Mamoudzou